

2001-2003
Government members 2001–2003, Åland Centre (c), Åland liberals (lib)

Premier (lantråd): 
Mr. Roger Nordlund (c) 
Deputy premier (vice lantråd), minister for finance: 
Mr. Olof Erland (lib) 
Minister of social affairs and environment: 
Mr. Sune Eriksson (lib) 
Minister of education and culture: 
Mrs. Gun Carlson (c) 
Minister of industry and trade: 
Mrs. Ritva Sarin-Grufberg (lib) 
Minister of transportation and energy: 
Mr. Runar Karlsson (c)

1999-2001
Government members 1999–2001, Åland Centre (c), Åland Conservatives (fs), the independent group (ob):

Premier (lantråd): 
Mr. Roger Nordlund (c) 
Deputy premier (vice lantråd), minister for finance: 
Mr. Olof Salmén (ob) 
Minister of social affairs and environment: 
Mrs. Harriet Lindeman (fs) 
Minister of education and culture: 
Mrs. Gun Carlson (c) 
Minister of industry and trade: 
Mr. Roger Jansson (fs) 
Minister of transportation and energy: 
Mr. Runar Karlsson (c) 
Minister of information technology and law affairs: 
Mr. Danne Sundman (ob)

Government of Åland
Politics of Åland